Ingo Dietmar Buding (9 January 1942 – 13 March 2003) was a West German tennis player. His sisters Edda and Ilse were also tennis players.

Buding reached the quarterfinals of Roland Garros in 1965 and won the boys' singles title in 1959 and 1960. At the 1968 Olympics exhibition event, he finished in second place to Rafael Osuna, and reached the second round of the main demonstration event.

External links
 
 
 

1942 births
2003 deaths
French Championships junior (tennis) champions
West German male tennis players
Tennis players at the 1968 Summer Olympics
Olympic tennis players of West Germany
Banat Swabians
Grand Slam (tennis) champions in boys' singles